Jay Cayuca is a professional violinist in the Philippines.

He was born in 1963 in Butuan. Coming from a musically inclined family, he first studied the piano at 6 years old. He later began studying the saxophone but stopped because of a medical condition. After seeing violinist Ronni Rogoff play on the television, he decided to shift to the violin.

He studied at the University of Santo Tomas, under the tutelage of Basilio Manalo, Leonidas Domingo, and Luis Valencia. He initially focused on playing classical music, but later shifted to jazz and pop music.

References
The Music of Jay Cayuca - from the Philippine Star. Accessed on 27 June 2010.
Jay Cayuca: A Violin Virtuoso - from The Iloilo City News Today. Accessed 27 June 2010
Jay Cayuca performs in Emilion - from The Iloilo City News Today. Accessed on 27 June 2010.
Jay Cayuca on the Organisasyon ng Pilipinong Mang-aawit registry.

Filipino violinists
Living people
1963 births
People from Butuan
University of Santo Tomas alumni
21st-century violinists